Silence' is the second and final album by Facemob. It was released on November 19, 2002 through Rap-a-Lot Records and peaked at 84 on the Top R&B/Hip-Hop Albums. Original member Devin the Dude did not participate on the album.

Track listing
"Young Gunz"- 2:21
"Lay It Down"- 4:12 (Featuring Yukmouth)
"Pimp City"- 3:19
"Bubble"- 3:38
"No Tomorrow"- 4:53
"Midwest Gunslangers"- 3:09
"All Balls, No Brains"- 4:35
"Headhunters"- 4:19 (Featuring Yukmouth and G-Mone)
"Gangsta Shit"- 4:48
"Fuck the Police"- 4:29 (Featuring Scarface)
"Rich Man, Poor Man"- 4:16
"Pleasure, Power and Pain"- 4:23 (Featuring Do or Die)
"Mob Business"- 3:26

2002 albums
Facemob albums
Rap-A-Lot Records albums